Epimactis metazona is a moth in the family Lecithoceridae. It was described by Edward Meyrick in 1908. It is found in Sierra Leone.

The wingspan is 25–26 mm. The forewings are white with the second discal stigma grey and with a narrow silvery-grey fascia close before the termen, dilated towards the costa but not quite reaching it. The hindwings are white.

References

Moths described in 1908
Epimactis
Taxa named by Edward Meyrick